Flavius Valerius may refer to:

 Flavius Valerius Severus (died 307), Roman emperor from 306 to 307
 Flavius Valerius Constantius Chlorus (died 306), Roman emperor from 305 to 306
 Flavius Valerius Constantinus, or Constantine the Great (died 337), Roman emperor from 306 to 337